The 2009–10 George Washington Colonials men's basketball team represented George Washington University in the 2009–10 NCAA Division I men's basketball season. The Colonials were led by head coach Karl Hobbs in his ninth year leading the team. George Washington played their home games at the Charles E. Smith Center in Washington, D.C., as members of the Atlantic 10 Conference. 

The Colonials finished conference play with an 6–10 record, earning the 10th seed in the Atlantic 10 tournament. George Washington was eliminated in the first round of the A-10 tournament by Dayton.

George Washington failed to qualify for the NCAA tournament, but were invited to the 2010 College Basketball Invitational. The Colonials were eliminated in the first round of the CBI by eventual tournament champion VCU, 79–73.

The Colonials finished the season with a 16–15 record.

Roster 

Source

Schedule and results

|-
!colspan=9 style=|Exhibition

|-
!colspan=9 style=|Regular season

|-
!colspan=9 style=| Atlantic 10 tournament

|-
!colspan=9 style=| CBI

References

George Washington Colonials men's basketball seasons
George Washington
George Washington
George Washington men's basketball
George Washington men's basketball